The Bulletin des Sociétés Chimiques Belges (CODEN BSCBAG) is the Belgium peer-reviewed scientific journal in chemistry. Originally it started under the name

 Bulletin de l'Association Belge des Chimistes [Vol. 1 (1887/88) to Vol. 17 (1903)],

but with Vol. 18 (1904) the title name changed. The journal is also known under the title

 Bulletin de la Société Chimiques de Belgique.

In 1998 this journal was absorbed by the European Journal of Organic Chemistry and the European Journal of Inorganic Chemistry.

See also 

 Anales de Química
 Chemische Berichte
 Bulletin de la Société Chimique de France
 European Journal of Organic Chemistry
 European Journal of Inorganic Chemistry
 Gazzetta Chimica Italiana
 Liebigs Annalen
 Recueil des Travaux Chimiques des Pays-Bas
 Chimika Chronika
 Revista Portuguesa de Química
 ACH—Models in Chemistry

External links 

 Homepage of the Société Royale de Chimie de Belgique 

Chemistry journals
Defunct journals
Academic journals published by learned and professional societies